Velas may refer to:

Places
 Velas, Azores, Portugal
 Velas, Maharashtra, India
 Cabo Velas, Costa Rica

People
 Sara Velas, American artist